The Gilliat River is a river in the Gulf Country region of Queensland, Australia.

The headwaters of the river are under Mount Edna in the Swords Range, it then flows in a northerly direction and crosses the Landsborough Highway near Hutt Mill and then continues north west. It then forms a series of braided channels as it continues through the mostly uninhabited Gulf Country savannah. Many channels then flow through the Cockatoo Waterhole and then the river discharges into the Cloncurry River of which it is a tributary.

See also

References

Rivers of Queensland
North West Queensland